Dave Hancox (born 2 October 1947) was an English footballer, who played as a centre forward in the Football League for Chester.

Professional career 
Hancox was part of a 1967-68 Welsh Cup semi-finalist Chester team that fell to the 3rd to last position of the Football League, ahead of Workington and Bradford Park Avenue. The first season of play for Hancox resulted in four goals in nineteen appearances as his team won 9, draw 14, and lost 23, including Chester going the final nine games of the season without a win. It would also be the only season of play for Hancox for Chester.

References

Chester City F.C. players
Sheffield United F.C. players
Runcorn F.C. Halton players
Association football forwards
English Football League players
People from Conisbrough
Footballers from Doncaster
1947 births
Living people
English footballers